The Archdeacon of London is a senior ecclesiastical officer in the Church of England. They are responsible for the eastern Archdeaconry (the Archdeaconry of London) of the Two Cities (London and Westminster) in the Diocese of London, an area without area bishop and, rather, overseen by the (diocese-leading) Bishop of London.  The immediate western counterpart in this area is the Archdeacon(ry) of Charing Cross.

Since 1989, the churches of this supervisory cleric are the numerous remaining churches of the City of London. Those of the Archdeacon of Charing Cross are the relatively few churches, but much more heavily populated zone that is the City of Westminster.

History
Before the 20th century, the early medieval-founded London archdeaconry included parts of the East End as well as the City of London. The extent of the archdeaconry was reduced in 1912 (with the creation of the Archdeaconry of Hampstead) and in 1951 (with the creation of the Archdeaconry of Hackney) then latest boundary changes with the creation of the Archdeaconry of Charing Cross in 1989 saw the archdeaconry become coterminous with the limits of the City of London.

Archdeacons of Charing Cross
This archdeaconry, comprising the City of Westminster, was created shortly before Klyberg's appointment in June 1989. The archdeacon serves directly under the Bishop of London, who takes direct responsibility for the Two Cities area since there is no area bishop.

On 16 June 2015, it was announced that from 1 January 2016 the Archdeacon of London would take responsibility for the whole Two Cities area; a part-time Associate Archdeacon would also work across both. Lain-Priestley was thus collated to the Charing Cross archdeaconry, and became known as the Archdeacon for the Two Cities. Lain-Priestley resigned this on 31 December 2018 to become an Adviser to the Bishop of London.

As Archdeacon of Charing Cross since 2020, Atkinson is archdeacon full-time.

List of archdeacons

High Medieval

?–bef. 1096 (d.): Edward
bef. 1102–aft. 1114: Reinger
bef. 1127–aft. 1152: William de Beaumis (son of Richard de Beaumis)
bef. 1154–aft. 1157 (res.): Hugh de Mareni
bef. 1162–aft. 1189: Nicholas
bef. 1192–aft. 1194: Peter de Waltham
bef. 1196–bef. 1199 (res.): Alard de Burnham
bef. 1202–bef. 1212 (d.): Peter of Blois
bef. 1213–bef. 1214: Walter
bef. 1214–aft. 1215: Gilbert de Plesseto
bef. 1217–aft. 1223: William of Sainte-Mère-Eglise
bef. 1225–bef. 1231 (res.): Geoffrey de Lucy
bef. 1229–aft. 1234: William de Rising
bef. 1235–aft. 1261 (res.): Peter de Newport
bef. 1263–aft. 1268 (res.): John Chishull
bef. 1272–aft. 1275: William Passemer
bef. 1278–aft. 1280: Geoffrey de Mortuo Mari
bef. 1281–1282 (res.): Richard Swinefield
bef. 1285–aft. 1290: Robert de Ros
bef. 1294–aft. 1299: Richard de Gravesend

Late Medieval

bef. 1302–bef. 1308 (d.): John de Bedford
?–bef. 1305 (res.): John de Sancto Claro 
Peter de Dene (disputed with Bedford)
1308–bef. 1320 (d.): Bego de Cavomonte
bef. 1309–bef. 1311 (d.): Reginald de Sancto Albano
1320–bef. 1323 (res.): Hélie de Talleyrand-Périgord
bef. 1321–bef. 1324: Richard de Aston
bef. 1323–bef. 1332 (d.): Pontius de Podio Barzaco
1332–aft. 1337: Itherius de Concoreto
13 September 1338–?: Edmund Howard
21 March 1339 – 1347 (res.): John of Thoresby
bef. 1350–1354 (res.): Richard Kilvington
1354–?: Peter Cardinal du Cros (also Cardinal-priest of Santi Silvestro e Martino)
1354–9 February 1356 (exch.): James de Beaufort
9 February 1356 – 1361 (res.): John Barnet
15 October–October 1361 (d.): Fortanerius Vassalli (also Patriarch of Grado)
26 March 1362–aft. 1372: Adam de Hertington
bef. 1383–bef. 1397 (d.): Thomas Baketon
10 February 1397 – 1400 (res.): Thomas Stowe
12 November 1400 – 1422 (res.): Reginald Kentwood
16 March 1422–bef. 1431 (res.): John Snell
28 January 1431 – 23 February 1443 (exch.): Richard Moresby
23 February 1443–bef. 1466 (d.): William Fallan
bef. 1469–1482 (res.): Richard Martyn (also Archdeacon of Hereford from bef. 1478 and Archdeacon of Berkshire from 1478; became Bishop of St David's)
22 June 1482–bef. 1490 (res.): John de Gigliis
16 November 1490–bef. 1502 (res.): John Forster
3 September 1502–aft. 1510: Pedro de Ayala

bef. 1510–bef. 1514 (res.): William Horsey
28 March 1514–bef. 1526 (d.): John Young, suffragan bishop (also Dean of Chichester from 1521)
29 March 1526–bef. 1529 (d.): Geoffrey Wharton
30 October 1529–bef. 1533 (exch.): William Clyff
5 August 1533–bef. 1534 (res.): Thomas Bedyll
19 December 1534–July 1543 (d.): Richard Gwent

Early modern

23 July–October 1543 (res.): Edward Moylle
29 October 1543 – 1554 (res.): John Wymmesley
27 April 1554 – 23 October 1559 (deprived): John Harpsfield (deprived; also Dean of Norwich from 1558)
1559–bef. 1591 (d.): John Mullins
1 June 1591–bef. 1626 (d.): Theophilus Aylmer (son of John Aylmer)
23 February 1626 – 19 September 1662 (d.): Thomas Paske 
11 October 1662–bef. 1664 (res.): John Dolben
27 May 1664 – 1676 (res.): Thomas Lamplugh (also Dean of Rochester from 1673)
27 April 1677 – 1689 (res.): Edward Stillingfleet
1689–1691 (res.): Thomas Tenison
1692–9 October 1731 (d.): William Stanley 
23 October 1731 – 15 June 1742 (d.): Robert Tyrwhit
12 July 1742 – 22 April 1764 (d.): Edward Cobden
24 April 1764 – 5 September 1770 (d.): John Jortin 
29 September 1770 – 1775 (res.): Anthony Hamilton
22 February 1775 – 1789 (res.): Richard Beadon
1789–bef. 1813 (res.): William Bingham
31 December 1813–bef. 1842 (res.): Joseph Pott
4 November 1842 – 27 November 1870 (d.): William Hale

Late modern

March 187111 August 1884 (d.): Piers Claughton
18841889 (ret.): Edwin Gifford
18891911 (res.): William Sinclair
19111930 (ret.): Ernest Holmes
19301947 (ret.): Ernest Sharpe
19471961 (res.): Oswin Gibbs-Smith (afterwards Dean of Winchester, 1961)
19621963 (res.): George Appleton
19631967 (res.): Martin Sullivan
19671978 (ret.): Sam Woodhouse (afterwards archdeacon emeritus)
197810 November 1986 (d.): Frank Harvey
19871999 (res.): George Cassidy
19992009 (ret.): Peter Delaney (afterwards archdeacon emeritus)
26 July 200931 July 2014 (ret.): David Meara (afterwards archdeacon emeritus)
 11 September 201430 June 2015: Nick Mercer, Vicar General and acting archdeacon
 1 July 20156 January 2016: Nick Mercer, Vicar General
 1 January 2016present: Luke Miller (working across both archdeaconries)

Archdeacons of Charing Cross
19891996 (ret.): John Klyberg, Bishop suffragan of Fulham (became a Roman Catholic priest and prelate of honour)
199631 December 2014 (ret.): Bill Jacob
1 January 201631 December 2018 (res.): Rosemary Lain-Priestley, Associate Archdeacon / Archdeacon for the Two Cities (working across both archdeaconries)
20172019: Paul Thomas, Acting Archdeacon of Charing Cross 
23 March 2020present: Adam Atkinson

Notes

References

Sources

Anglican ecclesiastical offices
 
 
Lists of Anglicans
Lists of English people
 
Church of England